Mohamedally Tower (also spelled Muhammad Ali Tower), also known as Juna Tower or Hararwalla Tower, is a clock tower in Siddhpur, Gujarat, India. It was inaugurated on 4 April 1915.

History
Mohamedally Sheikh Sharafally Hararwalla was a Dawoodi Bohra merchant from Siddhpur who owned the G. M. Mohamedally & Co. in Abyssinia (now Ethiopia). In 1914, on the  occasion of marriage of his daughter, he illuminated Siddhpur for three months. The Gaekwad rulers of Siddhpur had gifted him an elephant. The Devdi gate of town was demolished for entry of that elephant for the marriage procession. It was inaugurated on 4 April 1915 by prince Jayasingrao Sayajirao Gaekwad.

In 2018, the Siddhpur municipality has proposed to develop the tower as a monument.

The inscription on the tower reads:

Architecture
The tower is 60 feet high and has clocks imported from Europe on its four sides. It is built in the British colonial architectural style with imperial crown on the top. It is considered as one of the most notable landmarks in the town.

References

Siddhpur
Clock towers in India
Tourist attractions in Patan district
1915 establishments in India
Indo-Saracenic Revival architecture